Neo Maema (born 1 December 1995) is a South African soccer player who plays as an attacking midfielder for South African Premier Division side Mamelodi Sundowns.

Career
Maema started his career at Bloemfontein Celtic aged 22. After 60 appearances and 3 goals for Celtic, he joined Mamelodi Sundowns, he joined Mamelodi Sundowns on a five-year deal in summer 2021.

Style of play
Maema is a left-footed attacking midfielder.

References

Living people
1995 births
South African soccer players
Association football midfielders
Bloemfontein Celtic F.C. players
Mamelodi Sundowns F.C. players
South African Premier Division players